Bob and George was a sprite-based webcomic which parodied the fictional universe of Mega Man. It was written by David Anez, who at the time was a physics instructor living in the American Midwest. The comic first appeared on April 1, 2000, and ran until July 28, 2007. It was updated daily, with there being only 29 days without a comic in its seven years of production and with 2568 comics being made altogether.

Most Bob and George strips are still images. The initial strips were mostly done in GIF format (occasionally using JPEG for more graphic-intensive comics) before converting to PNG in May 2004. In addition, occasional comics are animated using either animated GIFs or Macromedia Flash. Some of the Flash comics have the characters speaking, voiced by Anez and others (often forum members). Animated comics are generally used for the annual week-long anniversary parties (usually culminating in a brief animated comic that recaps the events of the past year in a matter of seconds), for especially climactic scenes, and for a series of videos depicting an in-comic event known as "the Cataclysm".

The comic's plot is mostly made up of story arcs of varying lengths. Amongst past story arcs there have been retellings of various Mega Man games (which often play out quite differently from the originals), as well as battles against powerful foes. In addition, many of the story arcs involve time travel, dimensional travel, and villains who want to kill all the characters.

History

Bob and George was originally planned to be a hand-drawn webcomic about the college adventures of the two titular brothers. Slated to start on April 1, 2000, the plan fell through because Anez did not have a scanner with which to scan his drawings. He stated "I was hoping to use my friend's scanner, but he was never around." He instead released a sequence of filler comics using Mega Man sprites, which he intended to be a temporary measure until he gained access to a scanner, at which point he would implement his initial plan involving the hand drawn comics. He eventually purchased a scanner, and on June 1 he released the hand-drawn comic.

The hand-drawn comic was to revolve around a group of superheroes attending college. Neither the initial attempt nor a later attempt at it went well, and both times he returned to the Mega Man sprite comic. Anez has stated that he hated the hand-drawn comic. The hand-drawn comic made something of a return in the storyline "All Good Things"—the hand-drawn format is used to represent George's home dimension, though this time drawn by Liss, Dave's wife. Dave stated the reason for this is he realized that he still could not draw, and was not going to get any better.

However, this meant that the comic strip was titled "Bob and George", but did not contain any characters named "Bob" or "George". This was fixed with the introduction of sprite versions of the two characters into the comic. Bob is depicted as a gray Proto Man recolor while George is a Mega Man recolor with blond hair and no helmet.

David planned to end the comic by April 1, 2007, which is the end of the seventh year of the comic's run. However, the story took longer than expected, and the comic ended on Anez's birthday, July 28, 2007. There were a total of 2,658 daily comics produced.

Significance
While not the first webcomic to ever use video game sprites in place of hand-drawn art, Bob and George is noted as being the first sprite comic to gain widespread popularity and the originator of the sprite comic "craze". At the height of its readership in 2004, Bob and George held an Alexa traffic rank of around 20,000. Anez's comic "paved the way" for the creation of numerous other sprite comics, including Oldskooled, Life of Wily, and Brian Clevinger's 8-Bit Theater. Clevinger has called Anez "the Father of Sprite Comics" for his role in popularizing the phenomenon, and directly credits a friend showing him Anez's Bob and George for his inspiration to make his comic. Regarding the use of sprites in a comic, Clevinger has said,

Cast

Bob and George has a large cast of characters consisting of characters from the Mega Man series of games, as well as original characters created by Anez and others.
 Mega Man – the robotic protagonist of the original Mega Man video game series.
 The Author – the (nearly) all-powerful being who creates the comic. He appears as a blue/purple palette swap of Mega Man without his helmet. Alternate versions of The Author, such as "The Helmeted Author" and "The Shadowy Author", appear in Bob and George as antagonists.
 Bob – the younger, evil, and more mature brother of George. His alter-ego is Napalm, a super-powered being with control over fire. He is very adept at programming. He is a grey palette swap of Proto Man, with red hair underneath his helmet. His abilities in combat and his intelligence surpass most of the other characters, to the point he's referred to himself as a Mary Sue.
 George – heroic where his younger brother Bob is villainous. His alter-ego is Blitz, a super hero with control over lightning. George is a light blue and grey palette swap of helmet-less Mega Man with flat, blonde hair.

Other characters featured in Bob and George include Proto Man, Dr. Light, Roll, and Bass. Mega Man characters such as Dr. Wily, X, and Zero are featured in Bob and George as villains and adversaries.

Storyline
The plot of Bob and George involves various re-tellings of the plot from the Mega Man video games, interspersed with the characters interacting and sometimes battling villains of Anez's own creation. Time travel and inter-dimensional travel are common occurrences, with many of the characters hailing from dimensions (or times) other than that of the main continuity. This leads to a number of temporal paradoxes.

Story lines frequently involve breaking the fourth wall, with the strips' author being a regular character. A running theme of the comic is that most, if not all, of the characters are fully aware that they are in a webcomic.

References

External links
 
 Interview with David Anez
 A history of the comic's production, as described by a short series of comics from March 2005.

2000s webcomics
Sprite webcomics
American comedy webcomics
Mega Man
Video game webcomics
2000 webcomic debuts